Sexton may refer to:

Places
Sexton, Arkansas, United States, a former community
Sexton, Indiana, United States, an unincorporated community
Sexton, Iowa, United States, a former town
Sexton Glacier, a glacier in Montana, United States
Sexton's Burrows, peninsula at the harbour of Watermouth Bay on the North Devon coast, England, United Kingdom

People
Sexton (surname), people with the surname Sexton
Sexton Hardcastle, nickname for Adam Copeland, a pro wrestler

Arts, entertainment, and media
Sexton Blake (band), American band from Portland, Oregon
Sexton Blake, a character who appeared in numerous penny dreadfuls

Schools
CBS Sexton Street, Christian Brothers Secondary School in Limerick, Ireland
JW Sexton High School, Lansing, Michigan, United States

Other uses
Sexton (artillery), a self-propelled artillery vehicle of World War II
Sexton (office), a church or synagogue officer charged with the maintenance of the church buildings and/or the surrounding graveyard; and ringing of the church bells
The Sexton Irish Whiskey, a product of Proximo Spirits
Sexton beetle, alternative name for the burying beetle